...And the Family Telephone is the third full-length album by Maryland-based indie folk band Page France. It was released May 8, 2007, on Suicide Squeeze Records.

Track listing

References

External links
SuicideSqueeze.net

Suicide Squeeze Records albums
2007 albums
Page France albums